Events from the year 1646 in Sweden

Incumbents
 Monarch – Christina

Events

 Carl Gustaf Wrangel appointed the new leader of the Swedish army.

Births

 
 
 
 
 

 Görwel Gyllenstierna, female duelist  (died 1708)

Deaths

 Johannes Rudbeckius, personal chaplain to King Gustavus II Adolphus (born 1581) 
 November 29 - Laurentius Paulinus Gothus,  theologian, astronomer and Archbishop of Uppsala (born 1565) 
 Peder Jönsson, hunter and judged lover of sjörået (born year unknown)
 Elisabeth Gyllenstierna, court official (born 1581)

References

 
Years of the 17th century in Sweden
Sweden